A Bittersweet Life (lit. "The Sweet Life") is a 2005 South Korean neo-noir action drama film written and directed by Kim Jee-woon. It stars Lee Byung-hun as Sun-woo, a hitman who becomes targeted by his boss after he spares the latter's cheating mistress.

The film was released theatrically in South Korea on 1 April 2005. It opened on 265 screens throughout the country, and registered a total of 1,112,950 admissions by the end of its run. It was also screened out of competition at the 2005 Cannes Film Festival. A 30 seconds longer director's cut was later released, featuring slight cutting and re-arrangement of scenes, swapping of music placement and some additional scenes that do not appear in the theatrical cut. The film received an unofficial Indian remake titled Awarapan in 2007.

Plot
Kim Sun-woo (Lee Byung-hun) is a high-ranking enforcer and loyal subordinate of crime boss Kang (Kim Yeong-cheol). The two share concerns over business tensions with Baek Dae-sik (Hwang Jung-min), a son from a rival family. Previously Sun-woo had beaten up Baek's men for overstaying their welcome at their nightclub. Kang, preparing to leave on a business trip, assigns Sun-woo to shadow his young mistress Hee-soo (Shin Min-ah), whom he fears is having an "affair" with another man.

As Sun-woo performs his duty — following Hee-soo, and escorting her to a music recital - he becomes quietly enthralled by the girl's beauty as glimpses into his lonely, empty personal life become prevalent. When he does come to discover Hee-soo and her lover at her home, he beats up the man and prepares to inform Kang. However, he changes his mind and spares the two on the condition that they no longer see each other again, earning him Hee-soo's enmity.

Later, a man asks Sun-woo to apologize for beating up Baek's men, but he refuses. Agitated, he gets drunk in his apartment, and is kidnapped by Baek's henchmen. They prepare to kill him, but Kang saves him with a phone call. Kang, who has learned of his attempted cover-up of Hee-soo's affair, questions his motive, but he doesn't answer. Kang orders his men to torture Sun-woo, but gives him a chance to fix his mistake. Instead, Sun-woo escapes and vows revenge.

Sun-woo delivers Hee-soo a farewell gift, then attempts to buy a handgun. The deal goes bad and he ends up killing the arms dealers. This incurs a vendetta with the brother of one of the dealers, who goes to the nightclub he works at. Sun-woo lures Baek to an ice rink and kills him, getting injured in the process.

Undeterred, he arrives at the night club and kills his way in. Confronting Kang, Sun-woo vents over how badly he has been treated despite his years of loyalty. Receiving no justification, Sun-woo kills Kang. Baek's henchmen, who have been trailing Sun-woo, shoot at him and Kang's henchmen. Sun-woo emerges as the only survivor of the battle, just as the arms dealer's brother appears. Bleeding profusely, Sun-woo recalls watching Hee-soo's music recital. That was the only time he was seen smiling. The arms dealer's brother then executes him.

The film ends with a continuation of an earlier scene, where Sun-woo looks out of a window at the city below him. After making sure he's alone, he begins to shadowbox his reflection in the glass, looking very happy.

Cast
Lee Byung-hun as Kim Sun-woo
Kim Yeong-cheol as Mr. Kang
Shin Min-ah as Moon Hee-soo
Hwang Jung-min as Baek Dae-sik
Kim Roi-ha as Mun Suk	
Jin Goo as Min-gi
Lee Ki-young as Oh Mu-sung	
Oh Dal-su as Myung-goo	
Kim Hae-gon as Tae-woong	
Eric Mun as Tae-goo
Jeon Gook-hwan as President Baek
Kim Han as Se-yoon
Kim Sung-oh as Oh Mu-sung's subordinate	
Jung Yu-mi as Mi-ae

Soundtrack

The A Bittersweet Life original soundtrack was released on April 7, 2005.

Box office and critical reception
The film was screened out of competition at the 2005 Cannes Film Festival.

Critical reception was highly positive, with critics describing it as "organic, essential, beautifully staged and refreshingly realistic." Derek Elley from Variety magazine described the film as "a tour de force of noirish style and Korean ultra-violence that will have genre fans nailed to their seats."
 Sam Toy from Empire stated Lee "puts in a star-making performance as the brutal chief whip-turned-fugitive, never overplaying what could easily become hammy and clichéd, and easily holds this Korean noir together." He added "this is hugely enjoyable, and beautifully brutal."

Lee Byung-hun was praised for his acting ability with a critic from Cinema Eye saying that he "brings sheer excitement in his performance" and is "an angel dressed in vengeance." The critic also noted that A Bittersweet Life is "the best film of 2005." A critic from BeyondHollywood.com gave the film 4/5 stars. On Rotten Tomatoes, it currently holds a 100%, with an average score of 8.1 out of 10 based on ten reviews.

In 2009, Empire named it third in a poll of the "20 Greatest Gangster Movies You've Never Seen* (*Probably)."

When the film finally ended its theatrical run, it had 1,291,621 admissions.

Remake
The 2007 Indian film Awarapan contained plot elements similar to the film. The film, directed by Mohit Suri, starred Emraan Hashmi, Shriya Saran and Ashutosh Rana. In August 2017, an American remake was announced, with Jennifer Yuh Nelson to direct and Michael B. Jordan to star.

Awards and nominations

2005 42nd Grand Bell Awards 
Best Supporting Actor – Hwang Jung-min
Nomination – Best Film
Nomination – Best Director – Kim Jee-woon
Nomination – Best Actor – Lee Byung-hun
Nomination – Best Cinematography – Kim Ji-yong 
Nomination – Best Editing – Choi Jae-keun
Nomination – Best Lighting – Shin Sang-ryeol
Nomination – Best Art Direction – Ryu Seong-hee 
Nomination – Best Music – Jang Young-gyu, Dalparan
Nomination – Best Visual Effects – Kim Wook (DTI), Kwak Tae-yong (CELL), Demolition
Nomination – Best Sound – Kim Kyung-tae, Choi Tae-young (Live Zone)

2005 13th Chunsa Film Art Awards
Best Actor – Lee Byung-hun

2005 25th Korean Association of Film Critics Awards
Top 10 Films
Best Actor – Lee Byung-hun 
Best Music – Dalparan, Jang Young-gyu

2005 26th Blue Dragon Film Awards
Best Cinematography – Kim Ji-yong 
Nomination – Best Director – Kim Jee-woon
Nomination – Best Leading Actor – Lee Byung-hun 
Nomination – Best Supporting Actor – Hwang Jung-min 
Nomination – Best Lighting – Shin Sang-ryeol
Nomination – Best Art Direction – Ryu Seong-hee 
Nomination – Best Music – Dalparan and Jang Young-gyu

2005 4th Korean Film Awards
Best Supporting Actor – Hwang Jung-min

2006 42nd Baeksang Arts Awards
Best Actor – Lee Byung-hun
Nomination – Best Director – Kim Jee-woon

2005 38th Sitges Film Festival
Best Original Soundtrack – Dalparan and Jang Young-gyu
Nomination – Best Film

2006 8th Deauville Asian Film Festival 
 Lotus Action Asia – Grand Prix Action Asia, Action Asia Prize

2006 10th Fantasia Film Festival 
Silver Prize, Best Asian Film
Best Cinematography – Kim Ji-yong

References

External links 
  
 
 
 
 
 

2005 films
2005 action films
South Korean action films
South Korean neo-noir films
South Korean films about revenge
Films about organized crime in South Korea
Films directed by Kim Jee-woon
2000s Korean-language films
CJ Entertainment films
South Korean films remade in other languages
2000s South Korean films